In mathematics, the theta correspondence or Howe correspondence is a mathematical relation between representations of two groups of a reductive dual pair. The local theta correspondence relates irreducible admissible representations over a local field, while the global theta correspondence relates irreducible automorphic representations over a global field.

Statement

Setup
Let  be a local or a global field, not of characteristic .

There is a classification of reductive dual pairs.

Local theta correspondence
 is now a local field.

The assertion that this is a 1-1 correspondence is called the Howe duality conjecture.

Key properties of local theta correspondence include its compatibility with Bernstein-Zelevinsky induction  and conservation relations concerning the first occurrence indices along Witt towers .

Global theta correspondence
Stephen Rallis showed a version of the global Howe duality conjecture for cuspidal automorphic representations over a global field, assuming the validity of the Howe duality conjecture for all local places.

Howe duality conjecture
.

The Howe duality conjecture for archimedean local fields was proved by Roger Howe. For -adic local fields with  odd it was proved by Jean-Loup Waldspurger. Alberto Mínguez later gave a proof for dual pairs of general linear groups, that works for arbitrary residue characteristic.  For orthogonal-symplectic or unitary dual pairs, it was proved by Wee Teck Gan and Shuichiro Takeda.  The final case of quaternionic dual pairs was completed by Wee Teck Gan and Binyong Sun.

See also
Reductive dual pair
Metaplectic group

References

Bibliography

Langlands program
Representation theory